Vespasiano Vincenzo Gonzaga (1621–1687) was an Italian noble, by birth member of the House of Gonzaga and later Viceroy of Valencia.

Early life
He was the second son of Cesare II Gonzaga, Duke of Guastalla and his wife, Dona Isabella Orsini (1598–1623).

Marriage
He married in 1646 in Spain with María Inés Manrique de Lara, 10th Countess of Paredes de Nava.

They had 4 children:

 María Luisa Manrique de Lara y Gonzaga (1649–1721), 11th Countess of Paredes de Nava; married Tomás de la Cerda, 3rd Marquess of la Laguna, Viceroy of New Spain (1680-1686)
 Maria Josefa Manrique de Lara y Gonzaga; married Don Antonio Caspar Pimentel Banoso de Ribera, 4th Marquesa de Malpica
 Isabella Manrique de Lara y Gonzaga; died young
 Diego Manrique de Lara y Gonzaga; died young

He was viceroy of Valencia between 1669 and 1675.

1621 births
1687 deaths
Vespasiano Vincenzo
17th-century Italian nobility
Viceroys of Valencia